Aerial rigging is a specialty within the field of rigging that deals specifically with human loads.  Aerial rigging is the process of setting up equipment used to make humans fly, specifically aerial circus and aerial dance equipment. The field is of critical importance, and a thorough grasp of the principles of aerial rigging is essential in order to ensure the safety of the artists and the audience.

Aerial rigging is commonly practiced to different degrees by specialty fabricators, professional riggers, professional aerial artists, as well as amateur aerial artists. Most aerial circus equipment is built by fabricators around the world that build equipment specifically for the circus industry.

Aerial artists, both professional and amateur, often become riggers out of necessity. They generally learn to rig what they need.

WLA (Weak Link Analysis) is the process of systematically analyzing aerial rigging for the weakest link or links in the system.  WLA is the most common process used by aerial riggers to assess and improve rigging.  However, it is not the only system used.

See also
 Fly system, theatrical rigging

References

 Introduction to Rigging: Lyras and Trapeze Bars 
 Introduction to Rigging: Aerial Fabrics 
 Rigging Math Made Simple 
 Allard-Buffet, Véronique. The Accommodating Showman. Diss. Carleton University, 2012.
 Brunsdale, Maureen, and Mark Schmitt. The Bloomington-Normal Circus Legacy: The Golden Age of Aerialists. The History Press, 2013.

External links
 Basic Circus Arts Instruction Manual: Chapter 8 - "Manual for Safety and Rigging." [PDF, 3.3 MB] European Federation of Professional Circus Schools (FEDEC), 2008.
 FM 5-125: Rigging Techniques, Procedures, and Applications. [PDF, 3.6 MB] US Army, 1995.
 Steven Santos. Simply Circus:  "Rigging I." [Powerpoint presentation, 572 KB]
 Aerial Arts FAQ
 Silk rigging tutorial and example
 THE Flying Trapeze Resource Page
 Acrobatic Rigging
 AERISC - Association Européen pour la Recherche, l'Innovation et la Sécurité du Cirque  (European Association for the Research, Innovation, and Safety of the Circus Arts) 
 High Performance Rigging for Aerial Performance

Circus skills
Special effects